David 'Dave' Hewitt (15 January 1980) was an Irish rugby union player. In his career playing at full-back and out-half he has represented Clontarf, Lansdowne, Old Belvedere R.F.C., Leinster, Connacht and Racing Métro 92 Paris.

References

Irish rugby union players
Lansdowne Football Club players
Clontarf FC players
Leinster Rugby players
Connacht Rugby players
Living people
1980 births
Ireland international rugby sevens players